James Innell Packer (22 July 192617 July 2020) was an English-born Canadian evangelical theologian, cleric and writer in the low-church Anglican and Calvinist traditions. He was considered one of the most influential evangelicals in North America, known for his best-selling book, Knowing God, written in 1973, as well as his work as an editor for the English Standard Version of the Bible. He was one of the high-profile signers on the 1978 Chicago Statement on Biblical Inerrancy, a member on the advisory board of the Council on Biblical Manhood and Womanhood, and also was involved in the ecumenical book Evangelicals and Catholics Together in 1994. His last teaching position was as the board of governors' Professor of Theology at Regent College in Vancouver, British Columbia, in which he served from 1996 until his retirement in 2016 due to failing eyesight.

Life and career 

Packer was born on 22 July 1926 in Twyning, Gloucestershire, England to James and Dorothy Packer. His sister, Margaret, was born in 1929. His father was a clerk for the Great Western Railway and his lower-middle-class family was only nominally Anglican, attending the local St. Catherine's Church. When he was seven, Packer suffered a severe head injury in a collision with a bread van, which precluded him from playing sports, so he became interested in reading and writing. At 11 years of age, Packer was gifted with an old Oliver typewriter. He went on to cherish typewriters for the rest of his life. In 1937, Packer went to The Crypt School, where he specialized in the classics. At age 14 he was confirmed at St. Catherine's church.

He won a scholarship to the University of Oxford, where he was educated at Corpus Christi College, obtaining his Bachelor of Arts degree in 1948. In a 1944 meeting of the Oxford Inter-Collegiate Christian Union (OICCU), Packer committed his life to Christian service. It was during this time that Packer became exposed to the Puritans through OICCU's library, which were an influence he carried for the rest of his life. He also first heard lectures from C. S. Lewis at Oxford, whose teachings would (though he never knew Lewis personally) become a major influence in his life.

After college, he spent a brief time teaching Greek and Latin at Oak Hill College in London. During this 1949–1950 school year, he sat under the teaching of Martyn Lloyd-Jones at Westminster Chapel, who also would have a great influence on his thinking, and who he would know and interact with later. In 1949, Packer went back to Wycliffe Hall, Oxford in 1949 to study theology. He obtained his Master of Arts degree in 1954, and Doctor of Philosophy in 1954. He wrote his dissertation under Geoffrey Nuttall on the soteriology of the Puritan theologian Richard Baxter. He was ordained a deacon in 1952 and priest in 1953 in the Church of England, within which he was associated with the evangelical movement. He served as assistant curate of Harborne Heath in Birmingham from 1952 to 1954. In 1954, Packer married Kit Mullet, and they had three children, Ruth, Naomi, and Martin.

In 1955, his family moved to Bristol and Packer taught at Tyndale Hall, Bristol, from 1955 to 1961. He wrote an article denouncing Keswick theology as Pelagian in the Evangelical Quarterly. According to biographer Alister McGrath, it is widely agreed that his critique "marked the end of the dominance of the Keswick approach among younger evangelicals". It was also during this time that he published his first book, Fundamentalism and the Word of God (1958), a defense of the authority of the Bible, which sold 20,000 copies in that year and has been in print since. Packer moved back to Oxford in 1961, where he served as librarian of Latimer House in Oxford from 1961–1962 and warden from 1962–1969, an evangelical research centre he founded with John Stott. In 1970, he became principal of Tyndale Hall, Bristol, and from 1971 until 1979 he was associate principal of the newly formed Trinity College, Bristol, which had been formed from the amalgamation of Tyndale Hall with Clifton College and Dalton House-St Michael's. He became editor of the Evangelical Quarterly in the 1960s, and eventually published a series of articles he wrote in the journal into a book, Knowing God. The book, published by Hodder & Stoughton in Britain and InterVarsity Press in the United States in 1973, became a bestseller of international fame and sold over 1.5 million copies. In 1977, he signed the Chicago Statement on Biblical Inerrancy.

In 1979, one of Packer's Oxford friends persuaded him to teach at Regent College in Vancouver, eventually being named the first Sangwoo Youtong Chee Professor of Theology, a title he held until he was named a Regent College Board of Governors' Professor of Theology in 1996. At Regent he taught many classes, including systematic theology and the Puritans.

He was a prolific writer and frequent lecturer, and a frequent contributor to and an executive editor of Christianity Today. Packer served as general editor of the English Standard Version (ESV), an evangelical translation based upon the Revised Standard Version of the Bible, and theological editor of the ESV Study Bible.

Packer was associated with St. John's Shaughnessy Anglican Church, which in February 2008 voted to schism from the Anglican Church of Canada over the issue of same-sex blessings. The departing church, St. John's Vancouver, joined the Anglican Network in Canada (ANiC). Packer, on 23 April, handed in his licence from the Bishop of New Westminster. (ANiC eventually co-founded and joined the Anglican Church in North America in 2009.) In December 2008, Packer was appointed an honorary clerical canon of St Andrew's Cathedral in Sydney in recognition of his long and distinguished ministry as a faithful teacher of biblical theology.

Packer had been the theologian emeritus of the Anglican Church in North America (ACNA) since its creation in 2009, being one of the nine members of the task force who wrote on a trial basis Texts for Common Prayer, released in 2013, and general editor of the task force who wrote for trial use To Be a Christian: An Anglican Catechism, approved on 8 January 2014 by the College of Bishops of the church. He was awarded the St. Cuthbert's Cross at the Provincial Assembly of ACNA on 27 June 2014 by retiring Archbishop Robert Duncan for his "unparalleled contribution to Anglican and global Christianity".

In 2016, Packer's eyesight deteriorated due to macular degeneration to a point where he could no longer read or write, consequently concluding his public ministry.

Packer died on 17 July 2020, five days before his 94th birthday.

Theological views

Inerrancy

He signed the Chicago Statement on Biblical Inerrancy, affirming the conservative evangelical position on biblical inerrancy.

Gender roles
Packer was a complementarian and served on the advisory board of the Council on Biblical Manhood and Womanhood. He thus subscribed to a view of gender roles such that a husband should lovingly lead, protect and provide for his wife and that a wife should joyfully affirm and submit to her husband's leadership. Complementarians also believe the Bible teaches that men are to bear primary responsibility to lead in the church and that as such only men should be elders. In 1991 Packer set forth his reasons for this in an influential yet controversial article called "Let's Stop Making Women Presbyters".

Calvinism

Packer held to the soteriological position known as Calvinism.

Evolution

Packer endorsed and supported books that have advocated for theistic evolution, but also expressed caution towards the validity of evolution.

Ecumenism

In recent years, he had supported the ecumenical movement, which drew criticism from other evangelicals. Specifically, Packer's involvement in the book Evangelicals and Catholics Together: Toward a Common Mission (ECT) was sharply criticised, but he defended ECT by arguing that believers should set aside denominational differences for the sake of winning converts to Christianity.

Packer took the side of evangelical ecumenism in opposition to Martyn Lloyd-Jones in 1966, then co-authored a work with two Anglo-Catholics in 1970 (Growing into Union) that many evangelicals felt conceded too much biblical ground on critical doctrinal issues. The publication of that work led to the formal break between Lloyd-Jones and Packer, bringing an end to the Puritan Conferences.

Works 
 Fundamentalism and the Word of God (1958; reprinted 1984) 
 Evangelism and the Sovereignty of God (1961 by Inter-Varsity Fellowship) (reprinted 1991) 
 Our Lord's Understanding of the Law of God (1962) 
 The Church of England and the Methodist Church: Ten Essays (1963)
 God Speaks To Man: Revelation and the Bible (1965) 
 Tomorrow's Worship (1966) 
 Guidelines: Anglican Evangelicals Face the Future (1967) 
 Knowing God (1973, reprinted 1993) 
 What did the Cross Achieve? The Logic of Penal Substitution (1974) 
 I Want To Be A Christian (1977) 
 The Ten Commandments (1977) 
 The Evangelical Anglican Identity Problem: An Analysis (1978) 
 The New Man (1978) 
 For Man's Sake! (1978) 
 Knowing Man (1979) 
 God Has Spoken (1979) 
 Beyond the Battle for the Bible (1980) 
 Freedom and Authority (1981: International Council on Biblical Inerrancy) 
 A Kind of Noah's Ark? : The Anglican Commitment to Comprehensiveness (1981) 
 God's Words: Studies of Key Bible Themes (1981) 
 Freedom, Authority and Scripture (1982) 
 Keep In Step With The Spirit: Finding Fullness In Our Walk With God (1984, reprinted 2005) 
 The Thirty-Nine Articles: Their Place and Use Today (1984) 
 Through the Year with J. I. Packer (1986) 
 Hot Tub Religion (1987) 
 Among God's Giants: Aspects of Puritan Christianity (1991) 
 A Passion for Holiness (1992) 
 Rediscovering Holiness (1992) 
 Concise Theology: A Guide to Historic Christian Beliefs (1993) 
 A Quest for Godliness: The Puritan Vision of the Christian Life (1994) 
 Knowing Christianity (1995) 
 A Passion for Faithfulness: Wisdom from the Book of Nehemiah (1995) 
 Decisions – Finding God's Will: 6 Studies for Individuals or Groups (1996) 
 Truth & Power: The Place of Scripture in the Christian Life (1996) 
 Life in the Spirit (1996) 
 Meeting God (2001) 
 God's Plans for You (2001) 
 Divine Sovereignty and Human Responsibility (2002) 
 Faithfulness and Holiness: The Witness of J. C. Ryle (2002) 
 The Redemption and Restoration of Man in the Thought of Richard Baxter (2003, based on his 1954 Oxford dissertation) 
 Knowing God Through The Year (2004) 
 18 Words: The Most Important Words You Will Ever Know (2007) 
 Praying the Lord's Prayer (2007) 
 Affirming the Apostles' Creed (2008) 
 Weakness Is the Way: Life with Christ Our Strength (2013) 
 Finishing Our Course With Joy  (2014)

In the Anglican Agenda series
 Taking Faith Seriously (2006) 
 Taking Doctrine Seriously (2007) 
 Taking Repentance Seriously (2007) 
 Taking Christian Unity Seriously (2007)

Collections
 The J. I. Packer Collection, edited by Alister McGrath (1999) 
 Collected Shorter Writings of J. I. Packer
 Volume 1: Celebrating the Saving Work of God (1998) 
  Volume 2: Serving the People of God (1998) 
 Volume 3: Honouring the Written Word of God (1999) 
 Volume 4: Honouring the People of God (1999)

Co-authored
 The Spirit Within You: The Church's Neglected Possession with Alan Stibbs (1979) 
 The Bible Almanac with Merrill C. Tenney and William White (1980) 
 Christianity: The True Humanism with Thomas Howard (1985) 
 New Dictionary of Theology with Sinclair B Ferguson and David F Wright (1988) 
 Knowing and Doing the Will of God with LaVonne Neff (1995) 
 Great Power with Beth Feia (1997) 
 Great Grace with Beth Feia (1997) 
 Great Joy with Beth Feia (1999) 
 Never Beyond Hope: How God Touches and Uses Imperfect People with Carolyn Nystrom (2000) 
 Knowing God Journal with Carolyn Nystrom (2000) 
 J. I. Packer Answers Questions for Today with Wendy Murray Zoba (2001) 
 Hope, Never Beyond Hope: Six Studies for Individuals or Groups with Leader's Notes with Carolyn Nystrom (2003) 
 One Faith: The Evangelical Consensus with Thomas Oden (2004) 
 Battle for the Soul of Canada: Raising up the Emerging Generation of Leaders (2006) 
 Praying: Finding Our Way Through Duty To Delight with Carolyn Nystrom (2006) 
 Guard Us, Guide Us: Divine Leading in Life's Decisions with Carolyn Nystrom (2008) 
 In My Place Condemned He Stood: Celebrating the Glory of the Atonement with Mark Dever (2008)

Works about
 Alister E McGrath, To Know and Serve God: A Life of James I. Packer (1997) 
 Alister E McGrath, J. I. Packer: A Biography (1997) 
 Roger Steer, Guarding the Holy Fire: The Evangelicalism of John R. W. Stott, J. I. Packer and Alister McGrath (1999) 
 Don J Payne, The Theology of the Christian Life in J. I. Packer's Thought: Theological Anthropology, Theological Method, and the Doctrine of Sanctification (2006) 
 Timothy F George, J. I. Packer and the Evangelical Future: The Impact of His Life and Thought (2009) 
 Leland Ryken, J. I. Packer: An Evangelical Life (2015)

Notes

References

External links 
 Interview with J. I. Packer about his work on the English Standard Version Bible
 Extensive list of published works and online articles from Monergism.com
 Penal Substitution Revisited by J. I. Packer, on www.theologynetwork.org

1926 births
2020 deaths
20th-century Anglican theologians
20th-century English Anglican priests
20th-century English theologians
21st-century Anglican theologians
21st-century English Anglican priests
21st-century English theologians
Alumni of Corpus Christi College, Oxford
Alumni of Wycliffe Hall, Oxford
English emigrants to Canada
Canadian Anglican Church in North America priests
Canadian Anglican theologians
Canadian Calvinist and Reformed theologians
Canadian evangelicals
Christian humanists
People in Christian ecumenism
Critics of atheism
English Anglican theologians
English Calvinist and Reformed theologians
English evangelicals
Evangelical Anglican clergy
Evangelical Anglican theologians
People from Gloucestershire
Staff of Trinity College, Bristol
Systematic theologians
Theistic evolutionists
Writers from Vancouver
Academic staff of Regent College
Anglican realignment people